2013 Regional League Division 2  Southern Region is the 5th season of the League competition since its establishment in 2009. It is in the third tier of the Thai football league system.

Changes from last season

Team changes

Promoted clubs

No club was promoted to the Thai Division 1 League. Last years league champions Trang and runners up Pattani failed to qualify from the 2012 Regional League Division 2 championship pool.

Relegated clubs

Phattalung, Songkhla were relegated from the 2012 Thai Division 1 League.

Withdrawn clubs

Hat Yai, Songkhla have withdrawn from the 2013 campaign.

Teams

Stadia and locations

League table

References

External links
 Football Association of Thailand

Regional League South Division seasons
Sou